Samuel A. Massell Jr. (August 26, 1927 – March 13, 2022) was an American businessman and politician who served from 1970 to 1974 as the 53rd mayor of Atlanta, Georgia. He was the first Jewish mayor in the city's history and the most recent non-black mayor of Atlanta.

Early life and education
Samuel A. Massell Jr. was born to Samuel A. Massell (1892–1961) and the former Florence Rubin (1901–1977) in 1927. He was known as "Buddy" during his childhood and high school years. He graduated from Druid Hills High School at age 16 and enrolled at the University of Georgia in Athens, where he was a member of the Phi Kappa Literary Society. He was also president of Phi Epsilon Pi ( which later merged with Zeta Beta Tau) fraternity.

Massell later transferred to Emory University before being drafted into the United States Army Air Force in 1946. Later, he returned to the University of Georgia and took night classes and earned his bachelor's degree in commercial science from Atlanta Division of the University of Georgia in 1951. He received an LL.B. degree in 1949 from Atlanta Law School. He was married to the former Doris Middlebrooks from 1952 until her death in 2015.

Business career
A lifelong Atlanta resident, Massell has had successful careers in real estate brokerage, elected office, tourism, and association management.

For twenty years, Massell was a realtor, having become vice president of the Allan-Grayson Realty Company, then one of the largest commercial brokerage firms in Atlanta. During that time, he was elected a charter member of the "Million Dollar Club" of the Atlanta Real Estate Board.
He was further honored on three occasions by the Georgia Association of Real Estate Boards for the "Outstanding Transaction of the Year".

Political career
While in real estate, Massell also became active in a wide range of civic work, which eventually led to the political arena. He served twenty-two years in elected office, first as a city councilman in the town of Mountain Park, where he owned a lakehouse.  He then went to serving on the Atlanta City Executive Committee and then ran to serve eight years as President of Atlanta's Board of Aldermen (now the Atlanta City Council).  He ran for Mayor of Atlanta in 1969 and won the race in a runoff. Mayor Massell was also the president of the 15,000-member National League of Cities. In addition, he served a four-year term on the board of the Metropolitan Atlanta Rapid Transit Authority. He was a board member of the Atlanta Committee for the Olympic Games.

Among other achievements, his mayoral administration is credited with having established the Metropolitan Atlanta Rapid Transit Authority, the Omni Coliseum (the first enclosed arena in Atlanta), and Woodruff Park in Central City, all without higher ad valorem taxes. He also pioneered minority opportunities in city government, appointing the first woman to the Atlanta City Council and the first African Americans as municipal department heads. Conversely, Massell is also known to have used blatant anti-black rhetoric in his re-election bid for mayor against the city's first black mayoral candidate Maynard Jackson. As a result, many progressive and college-educated whites in the city (including Atlanta's largest daily newspaper) publicly endorsed Jackson which led to Massell losing his re-election bid in 1973 to Maynard Jackson.

Later life
After leaving full-time public service, Massell entered the tourism business in Buckhead in the Atlanta metro area. For 13 years, Massell operated in Buckhead under the name "Your Travel Agent Sam Massell". He was a Certified Travel Counselor and a former president of the Travel Industry Association of Georgia.

Massell later managed a nonprofit civic organization as founding president of the Buckhead Coalition, an association of business executives on the north side of Atlanta. In addition, he is in the Atlanta Convention and Visitors Bureau "Hospitality Hall of Fame"; International King Center for Nonviolent Social Change "Walk of Fame"; Georgia State University Robinson College "Business Hall of Fame"; Georgia Trend Magazine "Most Influential Georgians Hall of Fame"; and Georgia Municipal Association "Government Hall of Fame".

In 1971, he received an honorary degree in Doctor of Laws from Oglethorpe University.

In 2016, the 89-year-old Massell wed his long-time friend Sandra Gordy in a private ceremony at their home in Buckhead.

Charles McNair wrote a 304-page biography of Massell entitled Play It Again, Sam: The Notable Life of Sam Massell, Atlanta’s First Minority Mayor, which was published by Mercer University Press on September 1, 2017.

In early 2020, Massell announced his plans to retire. He died on March 13, 2022, at the age of 94.

References

Sources
 McNair, Charles. 2017. Play it Again Sam: The Notable Life of Atlanta's First Minority Mayor. Macon, GA: Mercer University Press.

External links
 Sam Massell papers from the Digital Library of Georgia

1927 births
2022 deaths
20th-century American businesspeople
20th-century American politicians
21st-century American businesspeople
American real estate businesspeople
Atlanta City Council members
Atlanta's John Marshall Law School alumni
Businesspeople from Atlanta
Georgia (U.S. state) Democrats
Jewish American people in Georgia (U.S. state) politics
Jewish mayors of places in the United States
Mayors of Atlanta
Military personnel from Georgia (U.S. state)
United States Air Force airmen
University of Georgia alumni